Sobráu is one of 44 parishes (administrative divisions) in Tineo, a municipality within the province and autonomous community of Asturias, in northern Spain.

Villages and hamlets
 Arroyu
 Campu
 Pena
 Sobráu
 Teixeiru
 Valentín
 Valmouriscu
 Viḷḷafronte
 Viḷḷamiana
 Vivente

References

Parishes in Tineo